Ashfield was an electoral district of the Legislative Assembly in the Australian state of New South Wales, first created in 1894 with the abolition of multi-member electoral districts from part of Canterbury, and named after the Sydney suburb of Ashfield. It was abolished in 1920, with the introduction of proportional representation and absorbed into Western Suburbs. It was recreated in 1927 and, in 1959, it was partly combined with Croydon and renamed Ashfield-Croydon. In 1968, Ashfield-Croydon was replaced by Ashfield, which was abolished again in 1999.

Members for Ashfield

Election results

References

Former electoral districts of New South Wales
1894 establishments in Australia
Constituencies established in 1894
1920 disestablishments in Australia
Constituencies disestablished in 1920
1927 establishments in Australia
Constituencies established in 1927
1959 disestablishments in Australia
Constituencies disestablished in 1959
1968 establishments in Australia
Constituencies established in 1968
1999 disestablishments in Australia